Kigumo is a village in Muranga County, Kenya.

Kigumo is located 15 kilometres west of Maragua town and 30 kilometres south of Othaya. Kandara, a small town, is located 10 kilometres south of Kigumo. Kigumo village is located between two other villages, Karega village at the east and Mariira village at the west.

It was part of Muranga District until 1996, when Maragua District was split from Muranga District. Kigumo was made the headquarters of Kigumo division, which is one of four administrative divisions of Maragua District. Kigumo division has the following three locations: Kangari, Kigumo and Kinyona. Kigumo is located within Maragua County Council. Kigumo Division was later made a district with its headquarters at Kigumo town. In 2010, these districts were merged into Muranga County.

Politics
Kigumo is also name to Kigumo Constituency, one of three electoral constituencies located in Maragua District.  The current member of parliament is Ruth Wangari Mwaniki.

Economy
The area's main economic activities are: tea and coffee farming and dairy cattle rearing, among others.  The people of Kigumo are also engaged in trading especially in Muthithi and Kangari trading centres.  Muthithi is the most famous market where the resident meets on Mondays and Fridays. Kangari market is opened on Thursdays. Other minor towns include Kirere, Mariira
and Ngonda. 
Kigumo is the birthplace of John Ngugi.

Education
Kigumo village has a primary school called Kigumo Primary School and a secondary school called Kigumo Bendera Secondary School.

There is a computer centre that offers internet services to the local people. The centre is also training the local people on computer skills in pursuant of the government vision 2030 to decentralize ICT to rural areas. It also has a resident magistrate court and a district health centre. Notable personalities from Kigumo include CS James Macharia, TSC Boss Nancy Macharia, Britm CEO Dr Ben Wairegi. Kigumo is also notable by the fact that most of the scrap metal dealers in Nairobi hail from Kigumo.

References 

Murang'a County
Populated places in Central Province (Kenya)